Chapayevskoye is a rural locality (a settlement) in Ertil, Ertilsky District, Voronezh Oblast, Russia. The population was 98 as of 2010. There are 2 streets.

Geography 
Chapayevskoye is located 6 km west of Ertil (the district's administrative centre) by road. Ertil is the nearest rural locality.

References 

Rural localities in Ertilsky District